The Mérida brocket (Mazama bricenii), also known as the Meroia brocket or rufous brocket, is a small species of deer. It was once treated as a subspecies of the similar little red brocket, but has been considered a distinct species since 1987, though as recent as 1999 some maintained it as a subspecies.

References

Mazama (genus)
Mammals of Colombia
Mammals of Venezuela
Páramo fauna
Mammals described in 1908
Taxa named by Oldfield Thomas